The 2021–22 Belgian First Division A (officially known as Jupiler Pro League due to sponsorship reasons) was the 119th season of top-tier football in Belgium.

Team changes
On the final matchday of the previous season, Royal Excel Mouscron was overtaken by Waasland-Beveren, pushing them into a direct relegation spot and thus causing the Mouscron team to return to the second level after six seasons. Waasland-Beveren would eventually face the same fate as a few weeks later they lost the Relegation play-off against Seraing, ending a span of nearly a decade at the top level.

The team from Seraing is a newcomer at the highest level, although a former team with the same name, R.F.C. Seraing (1904), last played at the top level 25 seasons ago and many supporters see the current Seraing as a continuation of the former. The place of Excel Mouscron was taken by 2020–21 Belgian First Division B champions and former Belgian giants Union SG, who return to the top level after 48 years and already gained 11 Belgian Championship titles, mostly in the 1900s and 1930s.

Format change
Originally, as decided in 2020, the clubs agreed to reduce the number of teams again to 16 following the 2021–22 season, as due to the COVID-19 pandemic exceptionally no teams were relegated from the 2019–20 Belgian First Division A, which causing the league to temporarily expand to 18. This would mean that there would be three teams relegating from the 2021–22 Belgian First Division A with only one team promoted from the 2021–22 Belgian First Division B. However, on 14 June 2021, the clubs agreed to keep playing with 18 teams at the highest level up to (and including) the 2022–23 season, meaning that the 2021–22 Belgian First Division would continue the format of the previous season, with only one team relegating and the penultimate team playing a play-off match against the runner-up up the 2021–22 Belgian First Division B to avoid relegation. The title and Europa League playoffs remain shortened, with only the top four teams playing for the title and number 5 through 8 playing the Europa League playoffs. For the teams finishing in positions 9 through 16, the season ends immediately following the regular season. The request to keep playing with 18 teams at the highest level mainly came from the smaller teams which were already struggling following the financial impact of the COVID-19 pandemic. The bigger clubs agreed to continue the current format but demanded that U23 teams be permanently added to the lower leagues. As such, the intention is that from the 2022–23 season on, there will be 4 U23 teams playing added to each of the second, third and fourth level of Belgian football, with the final standings of the 2021–22 U23 league to determine which team will start at which level.

Teams

Stadiums and locations

Number of teams by provinces

Personnel and kits

Managerial changes

Regular season

League table

Positions by round 
The table lists the positions of teams after completion of each round. However, several matches were not completed in the intended timeframe, resulting in the table below showing teams with different number of matches played as from matchday 19:
 The match between Standard Liège and Beerschot of matchday 19 was postponed due to a strike by the police. With the match being cancelled less than three hours prior to the match, Beerschot requested to be given a 0–3 win by forfeit; however the ruling was not in their favour.
 The match between Kortrijk and Antwerp of matchday 21 was postponed due to a large number of players of Antwerp testing positive for COVID-19 one day prior to the match. The match was played between matchdays 25 and 26.
 With Genk missing nine players in January 2022 due to the 2021 Africa Cup of Nations and the CONMEBOL 2022 FIFA World Cup qualifiers, the club was allowed to shift two of its matches. The match between Genk and Mechelen of matchday 24 was shifted forward and was played between matchdays 22 and 23, while the match between Oud-Heverlee Leuven and Genk of matchday 25 was moved backwards to be played between matchdays 26 and 27
 The match between Zulte Waregem and Oostende of matchday 22 was postponed due to a large number of players of Zulte Waregem testing positive for COVID-19 two days prior to the match.
 On 15 January 2022, KV Mechelen decided not to send a team to their away match at OH Leuven, as part of matchday 22. The club "wanted to make a statement", as their earlier request to have the match postponed was declined due to their third goalkeeper not being considered in the number of players testing positive, as he was still under the age of 21. Initially, the disciplinary committee ordered the match to be replayed, as it rules that the rule based on age was discriminatory and hence not legal, eventually however the Belgian Court for Sports Arbitration ruled in favour of OH Leuven on 9 March, awarding them a 5–0 forfeit win.
 Finally, the match between Standard Liège and Charleroi of matchday 17 was abandoned in minute 87 due to home supporter violence, while Charleroi was leading 0–3. Due to the combination of it being almost completed, Charleroi leading strongly and Standard supporters being the cause of the problem, main media outlets were reporting the result as final, already including three points for Charleroi  Only on 13 January 2022 it was ruled that the match would not be finished or replayed and that the result would stand.

Results

Play-offs

Play-off I
Points obtained during the regular season are halved (and rounded up) before the start of the playoff. Union SG started with 39 points, Club Brugge 36 points, Anderlecht and Antwerp 32 points each. As the points of Union SG and Antwerp were rounded up, in case of ties they will always be ranked below the team (or teams) they are tied with.

Play-off II
Points obtained during the regular season were halved (and rounded up) before the start of the playoff. Gent started with 31 points, Charleroi with 27 points, and both Mechelen and Genk with 26 points each. The points of Genk were rounded up, and hence in case of ties they will always be ranked below the team (or teams) they are tied with.

The winner of Play-Off II was originally scheduled to play the fourth-placed team of Play-Off I to determine which team would qualify for the second qualifying round of the 2022–23 UEFA Europa Conference League. However, since Gent won both the 2021–22 Belgian Cup (thus already qualifying for the 2022–23 UEFA Europa League) and Play-off II, the fourth-placed team of Play-Off I qualified automatically for the Europa Conference League and the European play-off was not contested.

Promotion-Relegation play-off
The team finishing in 17th place competes in a two-legged match with the runner-up of the 2021–22 Belgian First Division B, with the aggregate winner to play in the 2022–23 Belgian First Division A, while the losing team will take part in the 2022–23 Belgian First Division B.

On 2 April 2021, following a draw away to Oostende, Seraing was certain of finishing 17th and forced to play the relegation play-off against a team from the Belgian First Division B. Seraing had won promotion last season by winning the 2020–21 Promotion-Relegation play-off and will now be looking to avoid going down again the same way. One day later in the 2021–22 Belgian First Division B, RWDM lost their match away to Deinze, meaning they would finish second and thus play Seraing for promotion.

Seraing won 1–0 on aggregateSeraing remains in Belgian First Division A. RWD Molenbeek remains in Belgian First Division B.

Season statistics

Top scorers & assists
Source: Soccerway

Awards

Notes

References